The Yeprem and Martha Philibosian Armenian Evangelical College (A.E.C.) was founded in 1923 in Beirut, Lebanon. There are three sections to the school: a kindergarten for children aged 4–6 years, a primary section for children 6–12 years and a secondary level for those aged 12–18 years.

Dr. Zaven Messerlian has been the principal of the school since 1967 and in 2007, he got a tribute for his 40 years of service in Los Angeles.

History

The beginnings of the Armenian Evangelical College date to the early 1920s (official founding 1923), when, from simple origins among the growing immigrant group, a school was organized, which in time developed into a boys' high school. Meanwhile, in 1921 an Armenian Girls' American School had been established, under the auspices of the American Board of Commissioners for Foreign Missions.
In 1934 the two high schools were combined and were governed by a board of managers initially representing the entire Armenian Evangelical community in Beirut; it came under the sole jurisdiction of the First Armenian Evangelical Church of Beirut.

The AEC established the first baccalaureate class in 1960. In 1969 the “Second Baccalaureate” was started, with financial aid from Mr. S. Philibosian.

To date, the AEC has had almost 1500 graduates.

Miss Ruth Philibosian has sponsored the construction of a new building in memory of her parents, Yeprem and Martha.

See also
 Armenian Evangelical School of Trad (Trad, Lebanon)
 Armenian Evangelical Peter and Elizabeth Torosian School (Amanos, Lebanon)
 Armenian Evangelical Shamlian Tatigian Secondary School (Bourj Hammoud, Lebanon)
 Armenian Evangelical Central High School (Ashrafieh, Lebanon)
 Armenian Evangelical Guertmenian School (Ashrafieh, Lebanon)
 Armenian Evangelical Secondary School of Anjar (Anjar, Lebanon)
 Haigazian University (Riad El Solh, Beirut, Lebanon)

References

External links
 AEC Alumni Website
 Educational Council of the Union of the Armenian Evangelical Churches in the Near East (UAECNE) 

Schools in Lebanon
Educational institutions established in 1923
Armenian Evangelical schools
1923 establishments in Mandatory Syria